Stanley Asimov (/ˈæzɪmɒv/; July 25, 1929 – August 16, 1995) was an American journalist and vice-president of the Long Island newspaper Newsday.

Early life 

Asimov was born in Brooklyn, New York on July 25, 1929. Asimov's parents were Anna Rachel (née Berman) and Judah Asimov, a family of Russian-Jewish millers. He was the brother of author Isaac Asimov and Marcia Minnie Repanes. After becoming established in the U.S., his parents owned a succession of candy stores in which everyone in the family was expected to work. Asimov graduated from New York University and the Columbia Graduate School of Journalism in 1952.

Career 

In 1952, Asimov started working as a political reporter for the Long Island Newsday. After several editing positions, he became a publisher assistant in the late 1960s. He also held the position of vice president until the early 1990s before his retirement. After retiring, he edited a collection of letters by the author Isaac Asimov, his late brother, titled Yours, Isaac Asimov, published posthumously by Doubleday in October of 1995.

Personal life 
He married Ruth Evelyn Sheinaus (1922–2018) in 1955. They had two children: wine critic Eric and Nanette. Stanley adopted Ruth's son Dan by her previous marriage.

Death 

Asimov died on August 16, 1995 at Mount Sinai Hospital in Manhattan, of leukemia.

References 

American people of Russian-Jewish descent
People from Brooklyn